John Patrick Culpepper Jr. (born 1941) is a former American football player and coach.  He served as the head football coach at Northern Illinois University from 1976 to 1979, compiling a record of 14–29–1.

A native of Johnson County, Texas, Culpepper was a linebacker for the Texas Longhorns 1960–1962. He helped his teams to Southwest Conference championships in 1961 and 1962. Culpepper was an All-SWC selection in 1961 and a team co-captain as a senior. He is best remembered for his hit (along with Johnny Treadwell) on Arkansas' Danny Brabham in 1962 that forced a fumble at the goal line and spurred the Longhorns to a 7–3 victory and a SWC title.

Head coaching record

References

Further reading

1941 births
Living people
American football fullbacks
American football linebackers
Baylor Bears football coaches
Colorado Buffaloes football coaches
Memphis Tigers football coaches
Northern Illinois Huskies football coaches
Texas Longhorns football coaches
Texas Longhorns football players
Tulane Green Wave football coaches
High school football coaches in Texas
People from Johnson County, Texas